The 22nd Emmy Awards, later known as the 22nd Primetime Emmy Awards, were handed out on June 7, 1970.  The ceremony was hosted by David Frost and Danny Thomas.  Winners are listed in bold and series' networks are in parentheses.

The top shows of the night were My World and Welcome to It, and Marcus Welby, M.D.. Marcus Welby, M.D., and Room 222 each won three major awards. My World and Welcome to It won Outstanding Comedy Series, but was cancelled after its first season. It is currently the most recent series to win for Outstanding Comedy Series in the show's one and only season. Another oddity in the Outstanding Comedy Series category was that not one show nominated the previous year was nominated this year. This marks the last time that either series category (comedy or drama) has had this occur.

Susan Hampshire from The Forsyte Saga became the first Lead Actress, Drama to win outside the Big Three television networks - from the NET network. Her win was also the first for a British produced programme.

Winners and nominees

Programs

Acting

Lead performances

Supporting performances

Single performances

Directing

Writing

Most major nominations
By network 
 NBC – 32
 ABC – 28
 CBS – 9

 By program
 Marcus Welby, M.D. (ABC) – 6
 My Sweet Charlie (NBC) / Room 222 (ABC) – 5
 The Bill Cosby Show (NBC) / David Copperfield (NBC) / The Forsyte Saga (NET) Hallmark Hall of Fame (NBC) / Ironside (NBC) / The Mod Squad (ABC) / Rowan & Martin's Laugh-In (NBC) – 3

Most major awards
By network 
 ABC / NBC – 9
 CBS – 3
 NET – 2

 By program
 Marcus Welby, M.D. (ABC) / Room 222 (ABC) – 3
 Hallmark Hall of Fame (NBC) / My Sweet Charlie (NBC) / My World and Welcome to It (NBC) – 2

Notes

References

External links
 Emmys.com list of 1970 Nominees & Winners
 

022
Primetime Emmy Awards
Primetime Emmy Awards
Primetime Emmy
Primetime Emmy Awards